Cutleriaceae is a family of brown algae. It includes two genera, Cutleria and Zanardinia.

References

Brown algae
Brown algae families